Errol Clive Friedberg is a retired biologist and historian of science in the Department of Pathology at Stanford University and subsequently the University of Texas Southwestern Medical Center.

Education
He studied medicine at the University of Witwatersrand in South Africa, and subsequently received postdoctoral training in biochemistry and pathology at Case Western Reserve University before joining the faculty at Stanford University.

Research
Friedberg's research contributions center on understanding how cells repair and/or tolerate unrepaired damage to DNA and defining the biological consequences of unrepaired DNA damage. He has edited and written several editions of DNA Repair and Mutagenesis, published by ASM Press.

Friedberg has also published several volumes on aspects of the history of molecular biology, including Correcting the Blueprint of Life-An Historical Account of the Discovery of DNA Repair Mechanisms, The Writing Life of James D. Watson, From Rags to Riches-The Phenomenal Rise of the University of Texas Southwestern Medical Center at Dallas,  Sydney Brenner: A Biography, A Biography of Paul Berg-The Recombinant DNA Controversy Revisited, Emperor of Enzymes-A Biography of Arthur Kornberg, Biochemist and Nobel Laureate.

Friedberg has contributed over 400 papers to the scientific literature, and is Founding Editor-in-Chief of the scientific journal DNA Repair.

Awards
 Rous Whipple Award from the American Society for Investigative Pathology (2000)
 Fellow, American Academy of Microbiology (2002)
 Honorary Doctorate of Science, University of the Witwatersrand (2002)
 Lila Gruber Award for Cancer Research (2007)
 Fellow, American Association for the Advancement of Science (2007)
 Honorary Fellow, Royal Society of South Africa (2012)

Authored books 
 Learning About Your Genes- A Primer For Non-Biologists, pub. World Scientific Publications, Singapore
 The Sabbatical –A Story of Betrayal, pub. United PC Publishers, Fort Myers, FL.
 Emperor of Enzymes -- A Biography of Arthur Kornberg, Biochemist and Nobel Laureate, pub. World Scientific, 2016  
 A Biography of Paul Berg - The Recombinant DNA Controversy Revisited, pub. World Scientific, 2014 
 Sydney Brenner: A Biography, pub. CSHL Press, September 2010, .
 Sydney Brenner: My Life in Science, with Lewis Wolpert, edited by Errol C. Friedberg and Eleanor Lawrence, BioMed Central 2001, 
 The Writing Life of James D. Watson, pub. CSHL Press,2005, 
 From Rags to Riches-The Phenomenal Rise of the University of Texas Southwestern Medical Center at Dallas, Carolina Academic Press,2007, 
 DNA Repair and Mutagenesis (with G. C. Walker, W. Siede, R. D. Wood, R. A Schultz and T. Ellenberger), pub. ASM Press, 2006, 
 Cancer Answers-Encouraging Answers to 25 Questions You Were Afraid to Ask WH Freeman, New York, 1992,

References

External links
 

Cell biologists
Living people
Case Western Reserve University alumni
Stanford University School of Medicine faculty
University of Texas Southwestern Medical Center faculty
Year of birth missing (living people)